Sanam is a 1951 Bollywood romantic film directed by Nandlal Jaswantlal, who also directed the classic Anarkali. It starred Dev Anand, and his co-star was Suraiya, who also recorded the playback singing for the film. Meena Kumari acted in the film in a supporting role, where she played the role of Suraiya's best friend. The film was unsuccessful at the box office, which attributed to Suraiya's fading stardom in the early 1950s, and Madhubala's and Nargis' simultaneous rise as the top female stars.

Story
Sanam is a romantic comedy, where Yogen (Dev Anand), a poor educated young man, who is unemployed, comes across Sadhana (Suraiya) and Rani (Meena Kumari) in a chance encounter in a book shop. He was there to request the shopkeeper for a job, which the latter turns down and shows him the door.  While exiting, Yogen finds the handbag of Sadhna, absentmindedly left behind by her and returns to her.  Sadhna is impressed by his honesty, when he declines her offer of a large wad of currency notes as a reward.  Consequently, she develops feelings for Yogen. In the meanwhile, when he could not land a job, Yogen  snatches fifty rupees from a wealthy merchant for treatment of his ailing mother. Unfortunately, the merchant is runover by an approaching motor-car while Yogen was being pursued by him.  Yogen is convicted for homicide and jailed, aided by the strong arguments put-forth by the Prosecution(Govt.) Counsel(K.N. Singh), who happens to be Sadhana's father. While going for hitch-hiking near the jail, where Yogen was incarcerated, unknowingly, Sadhna halts her motor-car for a short while.  Incidentally, at the very same moment, Yogen escapes from jail and hides in the vehicle to evade the pursuing jail-guards.  Sadhna and Rani recognize him and bring him along.  Sadhna's dormant feelings for Yogen are rekindled and she becomes besotted with him following the incident of Yogen rescuing her from an accidental fire, where she and her friends were staging a play for the benefit of some ex-convicts.  Yogen after failing to convince Sadhna to find a partner matching her social stature, finally respects her affection and gives in. Sadhna is an independent-minded girl and does not hesitate to argue with her father about social justice for the poor and underprivileged. The story takes many twists and turns with songs and dance numbers as usually happen in movies.  But, their desire to marry is vehemently opposed by the father of the bride.  He even calls the police to arrest Yogen as he is the absconding murder accused.  Eventually, he relents as he realizes that Sadhna and Yogen are truly and passionately in love. He also realizes that Yogen is not after his wealth.  To make amends and to see his daughter happy, he resigns his Govt. Counsel's job and takes up Yogen's case as the defense counsel in order to save him.  It turns out that one member of the jury is the actual culprit, whose vehicle ran over and killed the wealthy merchant, who was pursuing a fleeing Yogen with the snatched fifty rupees.  The juror confesses to his crime and is taken into custody.  Yogen is absolved and is united with Sadhna.

For comic relief, there is a parallel track of Shri Rashiklal Mehta(Gope), Assisting Advocate to the Prosecution Counsel, who is infatuated with Sadhna without any reciprocation from her but, was at loggerheads with Rani.  At the end, he is also shown to be marrying Rani, when Yogen and Sadhna are united.

Cast
Suraiya as Sadhna
Dev Anand as Yogen (short form of Yogendra)
Meena Kumari as Rani (Sadhna's best friend) 
Gope as Rasiklal Mehta
K. N. Singh  as Government Counsel & father of Sadhana
Pratimadevi as Sadhna's mother		
Jilloo as Yogen's Mother

Music and songs

The film's music was composed by the duo Husnlal Bhagatram and all songs were composed by lyricist Qamar Jalalabadi

"O Sanam, Main Tujhe Pukaarun SanamSanam" – Suraiya, Mohammed Rafi
"Mai Kah Du Tumko Chor To" – Suraiya, Mohammed Rafi
"Bedard Shikaari Are Bedard Shikaari" – Lata Mangeshkar, Suraiya
"Mere Chahne Wale Hazar" – Suraiya, S. D. Batish
"Honthon Pe Kisi Kaa Naam, Isakaa Kyaa Matalab Hai" – Suraiya
"Honolulu, Kyun Hamen Paidaa Kiyaa" – Shamshad Begum
"Bolo Bolo Re Bhagwan Bolo Bolo Re" – Shamshad Begum, Suraiya
"Duniya Wale Meri Duniya Lut Gayi" – Suraiya
"Mera Dil Todkar Jaane Wale" – Suraiya
"Nayaa Nayaa Hai Pyaar Zamaanaa Dekh Na Le" – S. D. Batish, Shamshad Begum, Suraiya
"Ye Kehti Hai Dunia Tujhe Bhul Jau" – Suraiya
"Dil Le Gaya Ji Koi Dil Le Gaya" - Suraiya, Shamshad Begum

References

External links
 

1951 films
1950s Hindi-language films
1950s romance films
Films scored by Husnlal Bhagatram
Indian romance films
Hindi-language romance films